Maxim Raileanu (born 4 October 1994) is a Moldovan long-distance runner. In 2020, he competed in the men's race at the 2020 World Athletics Half Marathon Championships held in Gdynia, Poland.

In 2019, he competed in the men's half marathon at the 2019 Summer Universiade held in Naples, Italy.

References

External links 
 

Living people
1994 births
Place of birth missing (living people)
Moldovan male long-distance runners
Competitors at the 2019 Summer Universiade